Wuzurg framadār (meaning "the grand lord") was a Sasanian office which was equivalent to the office of Grand Vizier in the later Islamic period.

List
 Abarsam, active during the reign of Ardashir I.
 Khosrow Yazdegerd under Yazdegerd I
 Mihr Narseh under Yazdegerd I and Bahram V
 Suren Pahlav under Bahram V, possibly Mihr Narseh's direct successor
 Bozorgmehr under Kavad I and Khosrow I
 Izadgushasp under Khosrow I
 Piruz Khosrow under Kavadh II and Ardashir III
 Mah-Adhur Gushnasp under Ardashir III
 Farrukh Hormizd under Boran

Sources 

Positions of authority
Sasanian administrative offices
Persian words and phrases